Spillcam was a live feed of the leak site of the Deepwater Horizon oil spill. The live footage first became available to the general public on May 12 when BP was pressured by politicians to release the footage. The footage led lawmakers to accuse BP of misleading the public about the spill flow rate. On 3 June, the number of viewable vantage points available was increased from 1 to 12. The spillcam became an Internet sensation and at times received millions of views. In November 2010, "spillcam" topped the list of top words of 2010 on the Global Language Monitor's survey.

References

External links
IT & Telecom Solutions

Deepwater Horizon oil spill
Webcams
2010s neologisms